Cầu Giấy (lit. Paper Bridge) is an urban district of Hanoi, the capital city of Vietnam. It is bordered by Ba Đình district, Đống Đa district, Nam Từ Liêm district, Thanh Xuân district, Tây Hồ district, Bắc Từ Liêm district. As of 2019, there were 292,536 people residing in the district, the population density is 24,000 inhabitants per square kilometer.

The district is named after the historic bridge where the famous 19th-century Battle of Cầu Giấy (Paper Bridge) was fought.

Many new urban developments are located in Cầu Giấy. Among them, Trung Hoà - Nhân Chính is emerging as the new city's commercial center. It lies partly in the southern part of the district (Trung Hoà ward). The massive Keangnam Hanoi Landmark Tower, the tallest building in Hanoi and second tallest building in Vietnam, is also located in this area.

Administrative divisions
The district is divided into eight wards (phường):
Dịch Vọng
Dịch Vọng Hậu
Mai Dịch
Nghĩa Đô
Nghĩa Tân
Quan Hoa
Trung Hòa
Yên Hòa

Major streets
The street continues westward under the name Xuân Thủy Street and eventually becomes Route 32. Cầu Giấy Street is part of old Route 32. It used to be in Từ Liêm district and ran through farmland as part of the route to Sơn Tây. Now it is in Ngọc Khánh Ward of Ba Đình district and Quan Hoa Ward of Cầu Giấy District. In January 1998 it received its current name in honor of the former town of Cầu Giấy which also gave its name to the district.
 Đường Chùa Hà
 Đường Hoàng Đạo Thúy
 Đường Hoàng Minh Giám
 Đường Hoàng Quốc Việt
 Đường Hồ Tùng Mậu
 Đường Lê Đức Thọ
 Đường Nguyễn Khánh Toàn
 Đường Nguyễn Phong Sắc
 Đường Nguyễn Văn Huyên
 Đường Phạm Hùng
 Đường Phạm Văn Đồng
 Đường Trần Cung (Trần Cung Street) runs  from Phạm Văn Đồng Street southeastward past Hospital E to an intersection with Hoàng Quốc Việt Street.  At that point the road continues south with the new name of Nguyễn Phong Sắc Street. Trần Cung Street was formerly part of old Route 69 in undeveloped land in Từ Liêm district. In August 2005, it received the name Trần Cung Street in honor of Trần Cung (1899 - 1995), politician and judge.
It was formerly in Dịch Vọng village of Từ Liêm district, but is now in Dịch Vọng Ward of Cầu Giấy District. In July 1999 it was named after Trần Đăng Ninh (1910 - 1955), soldier and politician.
The road continues westward as the Đại lộ Thăng Long Expreesway. In 1998 Trần Duy Hưng Street was the first double-lane road opened to Hoà Lạc. Formerly it was in Trung Hoà village of Từ Liêm district, but now is in Trung Hoà Ward of Cầu Giấy District, part of Trung Hoà–Nhân Chính. In January 1999 it was named Trần Duy Hưng Street after Trần Duy Hưng (1912 -1988), a doctor and politician.
After crossing Nguyễn Phong Sắc Street the road continues east as Tô Hiệu Street. It was formerly in Dịch Vọng village of Từ Liêm district, but is now in Dịch Vọng Ward of Cầu Giấy District. In February 2003 it was named after former Security Minister Trần Quốc Hoàn.
 Đường Trung Yên (Trung Yên Street)
 Đường Xuân Thủy (Xuân Thủy Street)
 Phố Dương Quảng Hàm
 Phố Hoàng Sâm
 Phố Mai Dịch
 Phố Nghĩa Tân
 Phố Nguyễn Khả Trạc
 Phố Nguyễn Thị Thập
 Phố Phan Văn Trường
 Phố Phạm Thận Duật
 Phố Phạm Tuấn Tài
 Phố Phùng Chí Kiên
 Phố Tô Hiệu
 Phố Trần Bình
 Phố Trần Duy Hưng
 Phố Trần Quý Kiên
 Phố Trần Tử Bình
 Phố Trung Kính
 Phố Yên Hòa

Education
Korean International School in Hanoi, a Korean international school, is in the district.

References

Districts of Hanoi